Ranelic acid is an organic acid capable of chelating metal cations.

It forms the ranelate ion, C12H6N2O8S4−. Strontium ranelate, the strontium salt of ranelic acid, is a drug used to treat osteoporosis and increase bone mineral density (BMD).

References 

Carboxylic acids
Nitriles
Thiophenes
Amines